Christian Mwenelwata Bwamy (born 30 November 1989 in Kenya) is a Kenyan retired footballer.

Career

After leaving Kenyan side Mathare United, Bwamy spent the rest of his career in Norway with lower league clubs Follo FK, Valdres FK, and IF Fram Larvik, ending his career with fifth division team Bærum SK 2.

In 2015, he started studying law due to injury and became a lawyer full-time by 2019.

Bwamy made his debut for Kenya as an 88th-minute substitute against Nigeria in 2013.

References

External links
 Christian Bwamy at National Football Teans

Kenyan footballers
Living people
Association football midfielders
1989 births
Kenya international footballers
IF Fram Larvik players
Follo FK players